Vera Vorstenbosch (born 10 April 1987) is a former field hockey player from the Netherlands, who played as a forward.

Personal life
Vera Vorstenbosch was born and raised in Engelen, North Brabant.

Career

Club hockey
Vorstenbosch was introduced to hockey at age five, playing for Vlijmense.

Throughout her senior career, Vorstenbosch played her club hockey at Den Bosch. She was a member of the women's Hoofdklasse team for fifteen years, ending her career in 2017 with an eleventh league title.

International hockey

Under–21
In 2005, Vorstenbosch was a member of the Netherlands U–21 at the FIH Junior World Cup in Santiago. At the tournament, Vorstenbosch captained the Dutch side to a bronze medal.

Oranje Dames
Vorstenbosch made her senior international debut for the Netherlands in 2006, at the FIH Champions Trophy in Amsterdam, where she won a bronze medal.

Throughout her career, Vorstenbosch appeared for the Dutch side on thirty occasions, most notably winning a gold medal with the team at the 2009 EuroHockey Championships in Amsterdam.

References

External links
 
 

1987 births
Living people
Dutch female field hockey players
Female field hockey forwards